Tybalt is a character in William Shakespeare's play Romeo and Juliet. He is the son of Lady Capulet's brother, Juliet's short-tempered first cousin, and Romeo's rival. Tybalt shares the same name as the character Tibert / Tybalt "the prince of cats" in the popular story Reynard the Fox, a point of mockery in the play. Mercutio repeatedly calls Tybalt "prince of cats" , in reference to his sleek, yet violent manner.

Luigi da Porto adapted the story as Giulietta e Romeo and included it in his Historia novellamente ritrovata di due Nobili Amanti (Newly found tale of two Noble lovers) published in 1530. Da Porto drew on Pyramus and Thisbe, Giovanni Boccaccio's Decameron and a novella by Masuccio Salernitano. Da Porto gave it much of its modern form, including the lovers' names, the rival families of Montecchi and Capuleti, and their location in Verona. He also introduces characters corresponding to Shakespeare's Mercutio, Tybalt, and Paris. Da Porto presents his tale as historically true and claims it took place in the days of Bartolomeo II della Scala (a century earlier than Salernitano). Montague and Capulet were actual 13th century political factions, but the only known connection between them is a mention in Dante's Purgatorio as an example of civil dissension.

Role in the play
In Act I, Scene I, Tybalt enters and helps his own servants, Sampson and Gregory, who are fighting in the streets with servants of the Montagues, Abraham and Balthasar. Seeing Benvolio (Romeo's friend) trying to stop the fight, Tybalt draws his sword to fight Benvolio, saying:

What, drawn and talk of peace? I hate the word
As I hate hell, all Montagues, and thee.
Have at thee, coward!
—Act I, Scene I

Later, at the Capulets' ball, Tybalt is the first to recognize Romeo through his disguise, and would kill him if not forbidden by his uncle, Lord Capulet. His lust for revenge unsated, Tybalt sends a challenge letter to Romeo for a duel to the death. At the beginning of Act III, he enters looking for Romeo, only to create tensions with Mercutio, who was mocking Tybalt even before he walked into the scene. Tybalt initially ignores Mercutio and confronts Romeo, who refuses to fight because of his secret recent marriage to Juliet. Tybalt becomes even angrier; he does not know Romeo cannot fight him because they are now relatives.

Mercutio loses his temper and begins fighting Tybalt himself. Romeo tries to stop the combat by rushing between them, and Tybalt then stabs Mercutio under his arm. Mercutio dies from the wound, angering an already emotional Romeo. Enraged, Romeo duels and kills Tybalt in return, leading to his own exile by Prince Escalus. 

Tybalt is revealed to be Juliet's maternal first cousin, when Lady Capulet arrives at the scene where Tybalt lies dead, and cries
"Tybalt, my cousin, O my brother's child!"
—Act III

Performers
 Orson Welles performed the role in the 1934–1935 production presented by Katharine Cornell, in which he made his Broadway debut.
 Basil Rathbone performed the role in the 1936 Hollywood film Romeo and Juliet. He was nominated for an Oscar as Best Supporting Actor.
 George Chakiris performed the role of Bernardo Nunez, the Tybalt character in the 1961 film West Side Story, the musical modernised version of Romeo and Juliet. His portrayal won him the Academy Award for Best Supporting Actor.
 Michael York in the 1968 Franco Zeffirelli film version. Here, Tybalt is depicted as a jocular troublemaker, and is horrified when he fatally wounds Mercutio.
 Armand Assante in the 1977 Broadway revival.
 Alan Rickman in the 1978 television adaptation within the BBC Television Shakespeare series.
 John Leguizamo in Baz Luhrmann's 1996 modernised film adaption, Romeo + Juliet. This Tybalt is far more violent than in the play, holding a child at gunpoint and beating Romeo to force him to duel him (not to detract from the still-violent character of Shakespeare’s Tybalt).
 Tom Ross in the 2001 French musical Roméo et Juliette.
 Szilveszter P. Szabó in the 2004 Hungarian version of the  2001 French musical. This Tybalt has more of a backstory, and is more sympathetic than in the play.
 Jerry Midgeley in the 2013 adaptation by BRGS.
 Corey Hawkins in the 2013 Broadway revival.
 Ed Westwick in the 2013 film adaptation of Romeo and Juliet.
 David Alvarez played Bernardo in the 2021 Steven Spielberg film of West Side Story.

Analysis
Draper (1939) points out the parallels between the Elizabethan belief in the four humours and the main characters of the play; Tybalt is choleric: Violent, vengeful, short-tempered, ambitious.
Interpreting the text in the light of humours reduces the amount of plot attributed to chance by modern audiences.

Footnotes

References

Bibliography

External links
 

Literary characters introduced in 1597
Fictional Italian people in literature
Fictional murderers
Fictional nobility
Fictional swordfighters
Male Shakespearean characters
Characters in Romeo and Juliet
Shakespeare villains